This is a list of the 79 municipalities in the province of Huelva, in the autonomous community of Andalusia, Spain.

See also
Geography of Spain
List of cities in Spain

References

External links 
 Información sobre la Sierra de Aracena

 
Huelva